Azizmo Asadullayeva is the First Lady of Tajikistan and wife of Tajik President Emomali Rahmon.

Life and as First lady
She was born in the Tajik Soviet Socialist Republic in the USSR around the late 1950s. Not much is known about the First Lady of Tajikistan as she rarely accompanies Emomali Rahmon during international meetings or trips.

References 

Living people
First Ladies of Tajikistan
1954 births